Richard A. King (August 30, 1934 – January 15, 2018) was an American educator and politician in the state of Washington.

King was born in Ritzville, Washington, and attended the University of Washington, attaining B.A. and M.A. degrees. King was also an educator, serving as a faculty member of the Everett Community College for 31 years until this retirement in the 1990s. A Democrat, King represented the 38th district in the Washington State House, which included parts of Snohomish County. From 1965 to 1994, he served 15 consecutive terms. He and his wife Mary had 4 children.

He died on January 15, 2018.

References

1934 births
2018 deaths
People from Ritzville, Washington
University of Washington alumni
Democratic Party members of the Washington House of Representatives